Octappella is a seven-man contemporary a cappella group based in Utah. The members first sang together in college. Since forming Octappella, they have released three albums and were featured performers at the 2002 Salt Lake City Olympic Games. Their albums feature a mix of humorous and original material and covers of classic songs from groups such as Styx and REO Speedwagon. The group won two 2006 Contemporary A Cappella Society awards, one in the Religious Album category (for Worship) and one for Religious Song (for Anthem to My King, from Worship).

Members 
 Jeff Loveridge, bass
 David Pack, bass
 Brett Lambourne, baritone/vocal percussion
 Ryan Judkins, tenor/baritone
 Matt Cropper, tenor/baritone
 Jeremy Griggs, high tenor
 Wes Brewer, high tenor

Discography 
The Voice, 2000
Motion, 2002
Worship, 2005
Christmas, 2007

References

External links 
 Official Site

A cappella musical groups
American Christian musical groups
American boy bands
Musical groups from Utah
Musical groups established in 2000